Asylbek Talasbayev (born February 7, 1982) is an amateur boxer from Kyrgyzstan.  He qualified to compete at the 2008 Summer Olympics in the lightweight division where he upset Everton Lopes (9:7) but lost to Colombia's Darley Pérez.

Talasbayev also competed at the 2004 Summer Olympics. He qualified for the 2004 Athens Games as a featherweight (– 57 kg) by ending up in second place in the 2nd AIBA Asian 2004 Olympic Qualifying Tournament in Karachi, Pakistan. In the final he lost to Pakistan's Ahmed Sohail.

References
sports-reference

External links
 

1982 births
Living people
Kyrgyzstani male boxers
Lightweight boxers
Olympic boxers of Kyrgyzstan
Boxers at the 2004 Summer Olympics
Boxers at the 2008 Summer Olympics
Boxers at the 2006 Asian Games
Boxers at the 2010 Asian Games
Asian Games competitors for Kyrgyzstan